Ekbom syndrome may refer to:

 Delusional parasitosis
 Wittmaack-Ekbom syndrome, a synonym of restless legs syndrome